Coastal Forces was a division of the Royal Navy established during World War II. It consisted of small coastal defence craft such as motor launches, submarine chasers, air-sea rescue launches, motor gun boats and motor torpedo boats. It did not include minesweepers, naval trawlers or landing craft. This article is about the equivalent boats used in the Royal New Zealand Navy (RNZN).

From 1921 until 1941 the New Zealand Navy was a Division of the Royal Navy. The RNZN was not created until 1 October 1941. Within six months of its creation the RNZN commissioned twelve Class B Fairmiles and sixteen Harbour Defence Motor Launches (HDMLs)

RNZN Fairmiles
On 4 April 1941 the British War Cabinet approved a proposal for a striking force of anti-submarine motor-boats, six at Auckland, four at Wellington, and two at Lyttelton. Drawings and specifications of the Fairmile anti-submarine motorboat developed by Fairmile Marine were sent from England and it was agreed that these craft could be built in New Zealand providing the engines, ordnance and some prefabricated components came from England.

They were armed with a 2-pdr (40 mm) gun, a 20 mm Oerlikon cannon, twin 0.303 in machine guns and 12 depth charges, and were fitted with ASDIC (sonar).
 
The orders were distributed among four Auckland firms. The estimated cost of each vessel was £35,000, making a total of £420,000 for the twelve. Delays occurred in the delivery of prefabricated components, the difficulty in getting supplies of first-class kauri timber and a serious shortage of skilled labour.

The newly formed RNZN commissioned the 12 Class B Fairmiles on 20 December 1943 and assigned pendant numbers Q 400 through to Q 411. The boats were not initially named, and were identified only through their pendant numbers.

The first Fairmile constructed, Q 403, was launched on 29 September 1942 and commissioned on 21 October 1942. Thereafter the completed boats were delivered at short intervals. All the boats were completed and were then recommissioned into the newly formed RNZN on 20 December 1943.

RNZN Fairmiles in the Solomons
On 14 January 1944, Vice-Admiral William Halsey, Jr., Commander, South Pacific Area (part of the larger Pacific Ocean Areas), informed the New Zealand Naval Board that the "current employment of Japanese submarines and estimates of their future employment indicate immunity from the submarine menace in New Zealand waters". He proposed that the New Zealand Fairmile motor launches should be employed in the Solomon Islands, relieving American destroyers and patrol vessels for duty elsewhere.

The twelve Fairmiles were refitted for service in tropical waters and formed into the 80th and 81st Motor Launch Flotillas. The 80th Flotilla consisted of MLs 401 to 406 and the 81st Flotilla of MLs 407 to 411. The flotillas were based at Renard Sound in the Russell Islands. The base was named Kahu and for administrative purposes ML400 was commissioned on 1 April 1944 as HMNZS Kahu. During the seventeen months of their service in the Solomons, from March 1944 until June 1945, the twelve Fairmiles logged  on anti-submarine screen patrols and on escorting ships. They had no encounters with Japanese forces.

RNZN Fairmiles post war
All the fairmiles returned to Auckland in July 1945. In 1946-47 all but Q 411 were sold to private buyers who used them for passenger and/or cargo service or as pleasure craft. Q 411 was sold in 1965. Q 409 was repurchased by the navy in 1953 and resold in 1963 to become the Auckland-Waiheke ferryIris Moana. Two other former Fairmiles were renamed the Ngaroma and the Colville and used as the main ferries between Auckland and Great Barrier Island. They were skippered by Len Sowerby and his son Lester.

RNZN Harbour Defence Launches
Sixteen Harbour Defence Motor Launches (HDMLs) purchased in the United States were commissioned between March 1943 and March 1944. They were armed with one 20mm Oerlikons, three Vickers K machine guns and six depth charges.

They operated as the 124th and 125th Motor Launch Flotillas, based on Auckland and Wellington respectively. They maintained anti-submarine patrols inside indicator loops. Though they were not tested by enemy action, the anti-submarine fixed defences at Wellington and Auckland attained a high degree of efficiency.

After the war, twelve were retained, three were sold and one was transferred to the Army. The remaining boats were refitted and re-engined with Foden diesels. These were subsequently used as fishery protection, survey and reserve training boats. All remaining boats were named and given new pendant numbers in 1950.

See also
Axis naval activity in New Zealand waters
 Minesweepers of the Royal New Zealand Navy
Coastal fortifications of New Zealand
Coastal Forces of the Royal Navy
 Coastal Forces of the Royal Canadian Navy
 Coastal Forces of the Royal Australian Navy
 Coastal Forces of World War II

References

Notes

Bibliography

 Cassells, Ken R (1993) The Fairmile Flotillas of The Royal New Zealand Navy. New Zealand Ship and Marine Society. 
 Harker, Jack (2000)The Rockies: New Zealand Minesweepers at War. Silver Owl Press. 
 McDougall, R J  (1989) New Zealand Naval Vessels. Page 85-98. 
 Waters, Sydney David (1948) "German Raiders in the Pacific" in Episodes & Studies Volume 1. Historical Publications Branch, Wellington. Republished by the NZETC.
 Waters, Sydney David (1956) The Royal New Zealand Navy, Page 204f, Historical Publications Branch, Wellington. Republished by the NZETC.
 Waters, Sydney David (1956) The Royal New Zealand Navy, Battles for the Solomons, Historical Publications Branch, Wellington. Republished by the NZETC.

Further reading
 Gillett, R (1983) Australian & New Zealand Warships, 1914-1945. (1st edition) 
 Navy Today - the monthly magazine of the RNZN contains a wealth of incidental information.

External links

Wartime picture of ML Q 411 (Kahu P3571) (scroll to bottom)
Picture of the Ngaroma and Iris Moana ferries ( ex fairmiles)
The Iris Moana
Photos of RNZN HDMLs

RNZN Museum - Defending New Zealand Waters
RNZN Museum - The Battle for the Solomons 1942
Indicator loops of the Royal New Zealand Navy

Royal New Zealand Navy

Military history of New Zealand during World War II